Zics is a village in Somogy County, Hungary, especially popular for Western European retirees.

Geography
The wildlife in the surrounding area includes deer, wild boar and foxes.

History
Zics was first mentioned as Zvch in 1295. In 1478, the settlement belonged to György Zichy. During the Turkish occupation, it was depopulated. German settlers came in the 18th century at the invitation of the Zichy family who revived the village.

Main sights
 Roman Catholic Church, built in 1786, dedicated to the Visitation
 Village hall

References

External links 
 Street map (Hungarian)

Populated places in Somogy County
Zichy family
Hungarian German communities in Somogy County